Into the Fire is a British television thriller drama series, written by Tony Marchant, that first broadcast on BBC1 on 14 February 1996, and ran for three consecutive nights. The series, directed by Jane Howell, stars Donal McCann as Frank Cody, a businessman whose struggling leather goods company is thrown a lifeline when it wins a new order from America. But when he re-mortgages his house to finance the project, events take a dramatic turn, and death, deceit and adultery arise from a misguided scheme to commit insurance fraud via arson.

The series co-starred David Morrissey, Sharon Duce and Sue Johnston, and was partially inspired by novelist Thomas Hardy's The Mayor of Casterbridge. The series was originally due to transmit in the autumn of 1995, but was pushed back to February 1996. The series was actor David Morrissey's first of three projects with producer David Snodin, with whom he later worked on Holding On and Passer By. Notably, the series has never been re-broadcast or released on DVD.

Cast
 Donal McCann as Frank Cody
 David Morrissey as Michael Ride
 Sharon Duce as Anita
 Sue Johnston as Lyn
 Neil McCaul as Martin
 Stephen Lord as Danny
 Anne Carroll as Ginny
 Carol Starks as Rachel
 Peter Wingfield as Karl
 Christopher Fairbank as Joyce
 Kate Reynolds as Holly

Episodes

References

External links

1996 British television series debuts
1996 British television series endings
1990s British drama television series
BBC television dramas
British thriller television series
1990s British television miniseries
English-language television shows